Bermondsey and Old Southwark is a constituency in the House of Commons of the UK Parliament. Since 2015, it has been represented by Neil Coyle, who was elected as a Labour MP but was suspended from the party in February 2022 following an accusation of racism.

History and boundaries

The seat was created for the 2010 general election, almost identical to North Southwark and Bermondsey seat previously held by Simon Hughes from the 1997 general election, on a review of parliamentary representation in London by the Boundary Commission for England facing very minor boundary changes.

The constituency lies within the London Borough of Southwark, which contains the Old Southwark area of the former Metropolitan Borough of Southwark and the neighbourhoods of Borough, London Bridge and Bankside. Within the constituency are Elephant and Castle, Walworth and Newington which were part of the old Metropolitan Borough.  The eastern half of the seat includes Bermondsey and Rotherhithe which were part of the Metropolitan Borough of Bermondsey, and which had been a separate constituency also. 
This seat is based on the 1997–2010 North Southwark and Bermondsey constituency. Following the 2002 redrawing of ward boundaries, parts of Faraday and Livesey wards that were part of North Southwark and Bermondsey transferred to Camberwell and Peckham. This successor seat is made from the following electoral wards within the London Borough of Southwark: Cathedrals, Chaucer, East Walworth, Grange, Newington, Riverside, Rotherhithe, South Bermondsey, Surrey Docks.

Constituency profile
Comprising the northern part of the London Borough of Southwark, the seat lies immediately to the south of the City of London.

The southern halves of the Thames crossings London Bridge and Tower Bridge are in the seat, as is the historic Southwark area, with its cathedral, the Globe Theatre and Borough Market. There is also extensive commercial development that has spilled over the river from the city, notably the Shard London Bridge.

To the east, the seat also includes the Rotherhithe peninsula, where contemporary housing now replaces former industrial areas, particularly around Canada Water and the neighbourhood of Bermondsey.

At its southern end, the seat includes parts of Walworth.  Here the seat adjoins Camberwell and Peckham, one of the safest Labour seats in London.

The seat had remained a rare example of an inner London Liberal Democrat seat since Simon Hughes first won it in 1983, until he lost it at the 2015 general election to Labour.

Members of Parliament
Note: the first MP was elected for predecessor Bermondsey seats continuously from a by-election in 1983 until the seat was created in 2010: see the former constituency of North Southwark and Bermondsey.

Elections

Elections in the 2010s

See also 
List of parliamentary constituencies in London
Southwark London Borough Council elections

Notes

References

External links 
Politics Resources (election results from 1922 onwards)
Electoral Calculus (election results from 1955 onwards)

Bermondsey
Parliamentary constituencies in London
Politics of the London Borough of Southwark
Constituencies of the Parliament of the United Kingdom established in 2010